Orašac is a village in the Kumanovo Municipality of North Macedonia. Before 2003 it was a standalone municipality. The FIPS code for it was MK75.

Demographics
According to the 2002 census, the village had a total of 387 inhabitants. Ethnic groups in the village include:

Macedonians 387

References

External links

Villages in Kumanovo Municipality